Amoolya Kamal (born 11 July 1984) is an Indian former footballer who played as a midfielder.

Career
Amoolya was born in Bangalore to parents Kamal and Chitra Gangadharan. Her father Kamal was a state-level footballer, while her mother Chitra played for Karnataka and also represented India women's national football team.

Amoolya represented India at the 2008 AFC Women's Asian Cup qualification and the 2012 Olympics Qualifiers. She was also a part of the national winning squads which played in the 2010 SAFF Women's Championship and 2010 South Asian Games. She was part of the team at the 2014 Asian Games.

She won in 2010 the Ekalavya Award, an award by the Government of Karnataka for the outstanding performance in sports.

International goals

Honours

India
 SAFF Championship: 2010
 South Asian Games Gold medal: 2010

References

External links 
 Amoolya Kamal at All India Football Federation
 
 Amoolya Kamal at Eurosport

1984 births
Living people
Footballers from Bangalore
Sportswomen from Karnataka
Indian women's footballers
India women's international footballers
Asian Games competitors for India
Footballers at the 2014 Asian Games
Women's association football midfielders
South Asian Games gold medalists for India
South Asian Games medalists in football